State Highway 162 (SH-162/OK-162) is a  (2.1 km) state highway in the U.S. state of Oklahoma that provides access from US-62/US-64/SH-16 to the town of Taft. The highway lies entirely within Muskogee County. Serving as a spur route itself, the highway has no letter-suffixed spur routes of its own.

Route description
The route's northern terminus is at Old Taft Road, the old alignment of US-62/64.

History
From the routes' establishment into the mid-1960s, US-62 and US-64 passed through Taft along what is now Old Taft Road en route to the county seat of Muskogee. On July 10, 1967, however, the state shifted the routes onto the present-day expressway south of town. SH-162 was created around the same time, allowing Taft to remain connected to the state highway system. The change to US-62/64/SH-16's alignment was not reflected on the official state highway map until the 1969 edition; this was also the first edition of the state highway map to show SH-162.

Junction list

References

External links

 SH-162 at OKHighways.com

162
Transportation in Muskogee County, Oklahoma